Christopher Conybeare is a retired Australian senior public servant.

Career
He was educated at North Sydney Boys High School and Sydney University.  The son of Judge Theo Conybeare QC.

Conybeare began his Commonwealth Public Service career in 1965 at the Department of External Affairs (later Foreign Affairs. There he held various positions, including postings in London, Bonn and Manila. In 1980 Conybeare joined the Department of the Prime Minister and Cabinet

Conybeare was appointed Secretary of the Department of Immigration, Local Government and Ethnic Affairs (later Immigration and Ethnic Affairs in 1990. He remained Permanent Head of the Immigration department until 1996, when he was one of six Secretaries removed from their roles by the newly elected Howard Government.

Notes

References and further reading

Year of birth missing (living people)
Living people
Secretaries of the Australian Government Immigration Department
Australian diplomats
People educated at North Sydney Boys High School